Katsu curry is a Japanese dish consisting of a pork cutlet served with a portion of Japanese rice and curry. It is served on a large plate and is typically eaten using a spoon or fork. The cutlet is usually precut into strips, eliminating the need for a knife.

Generally eaten as a main course, the dish can be accompanied with water or miso soup. In Japan, there are fast-food restaurant chains which specialize in serving katsu curry, with varying meats and types of curry. The pork cutlet can be substituted with chicken.

In Japan, the name refers exclusively to a dish of curry served with a cutlet. However, in the UK, the name is sometimes applied to any type of Japanese curry.

History 
Yomiuri Giants player Shigeru Chiba, a frequent patron of the establishment, complained that it was too bothersome to eat curry and katsu separately, leading to the creation of the combination. Currently, the restaurant advertises the dish as the "original curry" and "Chiba-san's curry" on its menu.

Gallery

References

External links 
 

Japanese cuisine
Pork dishes
Breaded cutlets
Japanese rice dishes
East Asian curries
Curry dishes